The Phake language (phaa-kay) or Tai Phake language is spoken in the Buri Dihing Valley of Assam, India.

Distribution

(Note: For an explanation of the notation system for Tai tones, see Proto-Tai language#Tones.)

The  corresponds to the modern Thai บ้าน, ban, and Shan ဝၢၼ်ႈ wan which corresponds to 'village'.

Buragohain (1998) lists the following Tai Phake villages.
Man Phake Tau (Namphake village, Assam)
Man Tipam (Tipam Phake village, Assam)
Man Phake Neu (Bor Phake village, Assam)
Man Mo (Man Mo village, Assam)
Man Phaneng (Phaneng village, Assam)
Man Long (Long village, Assam)
Man Nonglai (Nonglaui village, Assam)
Man Monglang (Monglang village, Assam)
Man Nigam (Nigam village, Assam)
Man Wagun (Wagun village, Arunachal Pradesh)
Man Lung Kung (Lung Kung village, Arunachal Pradesh)

Phonology

Initial consonants
Tai Phake has the following initial consonants:

Final consonants
Tai Phake has the following final consonants:

-[w] occurs after front vowels and [a]-, -[j] occurs after back vowels and [a]-.

Vowels 
Tai Phake has the following vowel inventory:

Writing system 

The Tai Phake have their own writing system called 'Lik-Tai', which they share with the Khamti people and Tai Aiton people. It closely resembles the Northern Shan script of Myanmar, which is a variant of the Burmese script, with some of the letters taking divergent shapes.

Consonants
 က - kaa - k - [k]
 ၵ - khaa - kh - [kʰ]
 င - ngaa - ng - [ŋ]
 ꩡ - chaa - ch - [t͡ʃ], [t͡s]
 ꩬ - saaa - s - [s]
 ၺ - nyaa - ny - [ɲ]
 တ - taa - t - [t]
 ထ - thaa - th - [tʰ]
 ꩫ - naa - n - [n]
 ပ - paa - p - [p]
 ၸ - phaa - ph - [pʰ]
 မ - maa - m - [m]
 ယ - yaa - y - [j]
 လ - laa - l - [l]
 ဝ - waa - w - [w~v]
 ꩭ - haa - h - [h]
 ဢ - aa - a - [ʔ]

Vowels
 ႊ - a - [a]
 ႃ - ā - [aː]
 ိ - i - [i]
 ီ - ī - [iː]
 ု - u - [u]
 ူ - ū - [uː]
 ေ - e/ae - [eː/ɛ]
 ႝ - ai - [ai]
 ေႃ - o/aw - [oː/ɔː]
 ံ - ṁ - [am]
 ုံ - um - [um]
 ွံ - om - [ɔm]
 ိုဝ် - eu - [ɛu]
 ်ႍ - au - [au]
 ်ွ - āu - [aːu]
 ွ - aw - [ɒ]
 ွႝ - oi - [oj]
 ် - final consonant

Notes

References

Buragohain, Yehom. 1998. "Some notes on the Tai Phakes of Assam, in Shalardchai Ramitanondh Virada Somswasdi and Ranoo Wichasin." In Tai, pp. 126–143. Chiang Mai, Thailand: Chiang Mai University.
Morey, Stephen. 2005. The Tai languages of Assam: a grammar and texts. Canberra: Pacific Linguistics.

Languages of Assam
Southwestern Tai languages
Endangered languages of India